The 1931 Workers' Olympiad was the third edition of International Workers' Olympiads. The games were held from July 19 to July 26 at Vienna, Austria.

Some 100,000 athletes participated the Olympiad, number includes the ones taking part at the mass gymnastics event. Games had about 250,000 spectators and they were larger than 1932 Los Angeles Olympics, both in number of participants and spectators. The opening ceremony Das Große Festspiel was written by Austrian writer Robert Lucas, music was composed by Argentinian composer Erwin Leuchter together with Franz Leo Human.

Workers' Olympiad was the largest sporting event held in Vienna by then. Praterstadion (today known as Ernst-Happel-Stadion) and an outdoor swimming pool Stadionbad were finished for the games. Final of the football tournament was played at Praterstadion in front of 60,000 spectators as the Austrian amateur team Freie Vereinigung der Amateur-Fußballvereine Österreichs beat the German team of Arbeiter-Turn- und Sportbund by 3–2.

Sports 
Athletics
Boxing
Canoeing
Chess
Cycling
Czech handball
Fencing
Football
Gymnastics
Motor cycling
Rowing
Swimming
Water polo
Weightlifting
Wrestling

References 

International Workers' Olympiads
Workers' Summer Olympiad
Workers' Summer Olympiad
International sports competitions hosted by Austria
Sports competitions in Vienna
Workers' Summer Olympiad
1930s in Vienna
Multi-sport events in Austria
Workers' Summer Olympiad